Philipp Eduardovich Davydenko (born 2 September 1992 in Volgograd) is a Russian tennis player.

Tennis career 
Davydenko has a career high ATP singles ranking of 390 achieved on 8 December 2014.

Davydenko made his ATP main draw debut at the 2009 Kremlin Cup in the doubles event partnering Ilya Belyaev losing in the first round to Martín Vassallo Argüello and Horacio Zeballos. At the 2014 MercedesCup, Davydenko qualified for the main draw, defeating Facundo Bagnis, Alexander Lobkov and Louk Sorensen en route. In the main draw he won his first round match defeating Blaž Rola 6–4, 7–6(10–8), before losing to Santiago Giraldo in the second round in three sets.

Davydenko is the nephew of Nikolay Davydenko, a former world No.3 on the ATP tour.

External links 

1992 births
Living people
Russian male tennis players
Sportspeople from Volgograd
People from Rhein-Erft-Kreis
Sportspeople from Cologne (region)